Lyudmyla Oleksandrivna Yanukovych (née Nastenko (Настенко); born 9 October 1949) is the ex-wife of former Ukrainian President Viktor Yanukovych and former First Lady of Ukraine.

Biography
Lyudmyla  was born in Yenakiieve, Donetsk Oblast, Ukraine SSR on 9 October 1949. She graduated from the Donbas National Academy of Civil Engineering and Architecture.

She worked at Yenakiyeve Iron and Steel Works, in the design and appraisal bureau. She was a specialist of the Enakievmetalurgbud Trust.

She married Viktor Yanukovych in 1971. In February 2017, Yanukovych stated that after 45 years of marriage he had divorced Lyudmyla. With her ex-husband, Lyudmila Yanukovych had two sons, Oleksandr and Viktor, and three grandsons Viktor, Oleksandr and Iliya. From 2006 to 2014, the younger Viktor was a member of the Parliament of Ukraine; he died in 2015.

Ukrayinska Pravda claims that during Yanukovych presidency his wife Lyudmyla lived separately in Donetsk. After the start of the War in Donbas she reportedly moved to Crimea.

References

External links

1949 births
Living people
People from Yenakiieve
First Ladies of Ukraine
Lyudmyla
Ukrainian women engineers
20th-century women engineers
20th-century Ukrainian engineers